Pushpanathan, better known by the pseudonym Kottayam Pushpanath, was an Indian author of detective novels in the Malayalam language.

Early life 
Kottayam Pushpanath was born Pushpanathan (Zacharia) in Kottayam district in Kerala, on May 14, 1937, to Sathyanesan and Rachel. He completed his primary and secondary education from Good Shepherd School and MT Seminary School in Kottayam and he graduated in History from the University of Kerala. After finishing TTC from Cambridge Nicholson Institute (CNI) Kottayam, he started his career as a teacher in Kodiyathoor School in Kozhikode. Later he served as a teacher of History in different Government schools in Kallarkutty, Devikulam, Karapuzha, Nattakom and Kottayam Medical college school.

Literary career 
As a student at the MT Seminary school, Pushpanath wrote a short story "Thiramala” (Waves) for the school magazine, announcing his entry into the world of writing. He released his first novel named Chuvanna Manushyan in 1968 which was a scientific thriller. Later on, he penned down more than 300 works including science fiction, horror fiction, fantasy, non-fiction and many short stories during the period of 1970s and 80s. Many of his works has been translated into different Indian languages such as Tamil, Kannada, Telugu, Hindi, Gujarati and Bengali. His novel Souparnika was serialised in Tamil. Kottayam Pushpanath has also translated Bram Stoker’s world renowned Gothic horror novel Dracula and Arthur Conan Doyle’s The Hound of the Baskervilles into Malayalam. Two of his novels – Brahmarakshass and Chuvanna Anki– were made into movies in Malayalam.

Pushpanath followed the tradition of Sherlock Holmes and Hercules Poirot in creating two fictional detectives, Detective Marxin and Pushparaj, the two names which became as popular as the name of the author itself. Detective Pushparaj would be the protagonist if the novels are set in India and Detective Marxin would take the lead role in novels set outside India. Some novels featured another fictional character, Detective Sudheer, as the lead.

Kottayam Pushpanath established his own publications in 1977, the Kottayam Pushpanath Publications, through which most of his works came out. All his books are being re-published by Rayan Pushpanath through Kottayam Pushpanath Publications now. Many of Pushpanath's books are published on mainstream digital platforms as e-books and audio books. Kottayam Pushpanath Foundation was set up by Kottayam Pushpanath family after the author's death, funded with the family’s assets and run by family members and foundation members for solely charitable purposes.

Death 
Kottayam Pushpanath died 2 May 2018 aged 80 at his home in Kottayam after a long bout of age-related problems.

Selected works

Chuvanna Manushyan (The Red Man)
Hitlerude Thalayodu (Skull of Hitler)
Maranamillathavan (The Immortal)
Olimbassile Raktharakshass (Vampire in Olympus)
Plutoyude Kottaram (Castle of Pluto)
Thaimoorinte Thalayodu (Skull of Taimur)
Aalmarattam
King Cobra
Diamond Girl
Kazhukan
Chuvanna Anki
Bhrammarakshass
Pharahonte Maranamuri (The Death Room of Pharaoh)
Draculayude Makal (The Daughter of Dracula)
Lucifer
Dracula (Malayalam translation of Dracula)
Dracula Unarunnu (Rise of Dracula)
Draculayude Nizhal (Shadow of Dracula)
Dracula Asiayil (Dracula in Asia)
Dracula Kotta (Castle of Dracula)
Draculakottayile Sundharikal
Draculayude Raktham (Blood of Dracula)
Draculayude Anki (Dracula's Coat)
Operation Space Rocket
Thurangathile Sundhari (The Beauty in the Tunnel)
Devil
"The Devils"
Rajarajeswari
Overbridge
Devil's Corner
Oru Narthakiyude Maranam (The Death of a Lady Dancer)
Parallel Road
Dial 00003
Devil's Corner
Dinosaurs
Level Cross
Timur’s Skull
The Murder
The Blade
Napoleonte Pratima (The Napoleon's Statue)
Simham (The Lion)
Murder Gang
Red Robe
Nizhalillatha Manushyan (The Man without Shadow)
London Kottarathile Rahasyangal (The Secrets of London Palace)
Monalisayude Ghathakan (The Murderer of Monalisa)
Cardinalinte Maranam (The Death of Cardinal)
Pandavan Mala
Rahasyam
Thandavam
Aaru Viral
Chuvanna Neerali
Death Rays
Hotel Psycho
Ladies Hostelile Bheekaran
Murder Gang
Luciferude Makal
Nagachilanka
Nagamanikyam
Neelaraktham
The Blade
Yakshimana
Durgakshethram
Chuvanna Kaikal
Ward 9
Death Circle
Triple X
Agnimanushian
Nalam Valavile Nagasundari
Mandramohini
Neelakannukal
Devayakshi
Gandharvayamam
Tornado
Rajkottile Nidhi
Yakshikkavu
Project 90
The Jeep
Garudan
Devanarthaki
Dead Lock
Avan Varunnu
Kazhukante Nizhal
Computer Girl
Detective Marxinum Bheekarasthvavum
Jarasandhan
Secret
Yakshiyambalam
Deadly Heart
Pischachinte Kotta
666
Bermuda Triangle

References

External links
 
 

1938 births
2018 deaths
Malayali people
Indian male novelists
Malayalam-language writers
Malayalam novelists
Writers from Kottayam
20th-century Indian novelists
Novelists from Kerala
20th-century Indian male writers